The Huntington Desert Garden is part of The Huntington Library, Art Collections and Botanical Gardens in San Marino, California. The Desert Garden is one of the world's largest and oldest collections of cacti, succulents and other desert plants, collected from throughout the world. It contains plants from extreme environments, many of which were acquired by Henry E. Huntington and William Hertrich (the first garden curator) in trips taken to several countries in North, Central and South America. One of the Huntington's most botanically important gardens, the Desert Garden brought together a group of plants largely unknown and unappreciated in the beginning of the 1900s. Containing a broad category of xerophytes (aridity-adapted plants), the Desert Garden grew to preeminence and remains today among the world's finest, with more than 5,000 species in the 10 acre (4 ha) garden.

Mr. Huntington was not initially interested in establishing a Desert Garden. He did not like cacti at all, due to some unfortunate prickly pear encounters during railroad construction work. But Hertrich was persistent, and, once won over, Mr. Huntington built a railway spur to his garden, to bring in rock, soil and plants by the carload. As Gary Lyons, a later curator, remarked, it's very convenient to have a rail spur, and deep pockets, when you're building a big garden. A trip to Arizona in 1908 filled three railroad cars for the trip back to the garden.

Famed Brazilian landscape architect Roberto Burle Marx called the Huntington Desert Garden "the most extraordinary garden in the world."

Desert Garden collections
Also see: Desert Garden Conservatory

The most significant collections are agave and related genera (Agavaceae), aloe (Aloaceae), terrestrial bromeliads (Bromeliaceae), cacti (Cactaceae), echeveria, crassula, sedum and related genera of succulents (Crassulaceae), euphorbia (Euphorbiaceae), and fouquieria (Fouquieriaceae), as well as nontaxonomic caudiciforms.

The Desert Garden agave and yucca collections, along with the cacti, are among the Huntington's most significant research collections. Huntington boasts the largest Yucca filifera in the world. The Huntington's Beaucarnea, Ponytail "Palms", members of the agave family (not true palms), are some of the oldest specimens in cultivation, and among the earliest plantings in the Desert Garden.

"Aloes" (Aloae) constitute one of the largest collections outside Africa. Aloe arborescens has an unrivalled winter display of fiery red flower stalks. About 200 of the world's 300 species of aloes reside in the upper garden. Most are from southern Africa. Aloidendron barberae (syn. Aloe bainesii), which can grow fifty feet high, is the tallest.

Puyas are terrestrial bromeliads (Bromeliaceae) that put on a spectacular floral display in April and early May.

Most desert columnar plants belong to the genus Cereus. They form the structure of much of the Desert Garden landscape, producing flowers in late summer and colorful fruit in September and October. Cereus xanthocarpus, at twenty tons, is the garden's most massive plant. This tree-like cactus was already a mature specimen when planted in 1905. It is approximately 125 years old.

The most spectacular cactus displays are the 500 bright yellow-spined Golden Barrel Cactus (Echinocactus grusonii), the largest being more than 85 years old. They flower in the Spring, and are native to central Mexico. This is probably the best display of Golden Barrels in the world.

The crassula family consists of unarmed leaf succulents found mostly in Mexico and Africa. Cool autumn brings out pastel leaf colors in aeonium, echeveria, kalanchoe, pachyphytum, and sedum.

The columnar cactus-like plants in the African section of the Desert Garden are succulent spurges (Euphorbia) and have caustic milky latex. Most species in the garden are native to South Africa and East Africa. Crown of Thorns (Euphorbia milii), the familiar house plant, is a spiny native of Madagascar that produces colorful bracts throughout the year.

The strange-looking boojum trees (Fouquieria columnaris) native to Baja California, are rare oddities in the Fouquieriaceae. The better-known ocotillo (F. splendens) is in the California bed. The central garden is landscaped with numerous fouquierias from Mexico with bright red blossoms most of the year.

The garden has the largest collection of living stones in America, small southern African plants of the genus Lithops.

The collection of caudiciform plants is equally significant. These plants produce very thick stems that can look like twisted sweet potatoes. The stem serves as a water storage structure known as a caudex.  The garden boasts an enormous specimen of Dioscorea elephantipes.

Source: unless cited separately.

Desert Garden gallery

References

Further reading

 Hertrich, William. "The Huntington Botanical Gardens, 1905-1949 Personal Recollections of William Hertrich."  Huntington Library Press. 1998. #9780873280969.
Lyons, Gary (1969): The Development of The Huntington Desert Garden: Past and Future. CSSA Cactus and Succulent Journal, 41: 10–19.
Lyons, Gary (2007), Desert Plants: A Curator's Introduction to the Huntington Desert Garden. Huntington Library Press,

External links
Official website
Huntington Gardens photo gallery at Flickr (Creative Commons)

Huntington
Gardens in California
Open-air museums in California
Parks in Los Angeles County, California
Sculpture gardens, trails and parks in California
Huntington Library
Cactus gardens